The 2014 Big Sky Conference women's basketball tournament will run from March 14–16, 2014. The champion of the tournament will receive an automatic bid to the 2014 NCAA tournament.

Format
Unlike most Division I conference tournaments in basketball, the Big Sky tournament does not involve all of the conference's teams. With the addition of North Dakota and Southern Utah to the conference for the 2012–13 season, expanding the number of teams from 9 to 11, the tournament expanded from six teams to seven. As in previous years, qualifying is based on overall conference record. The number of teams that fail to qualify also increased by one, going from three to four. All tournament games will be played at the site of the regular-season champion. The women's tournament remains with a Thursday-Friday-Saturday format. The field will be re-seeded after the first round so the #1 seed played will play the lowest remaining seed, while the highest remaining seeds will face off in the other semifinal.

Bracket

References

2013–14 Big Sky Conference women's basketball season
Big Sky Conference women's basketball tournament